GORITE or Goal ORIented TEams is a Java platform for implementing Team Oriented designs for Intelligent software agents.

See also 
 Belief-Desire-Intention software model
 Procedural Reasoning System

References 
 Ralph Rönnquist, "The Goal Oriented Teams (GORITE) Framework" In Programming Multi-Agent Systems, pages 	27-41, 2008
 Ralph Rönnquist and Dennis Jarvis "Interoperability with Goal Oriented Teams (GORITE)" In Agent-Based Technologies and Applications for Enterprise Interoperability, pages 	118-128, 2009

External links 
 GORITE Homepage

Agent-based software